Abu'l Irfan Allama Muhammad Bashir (24 September 1940 – 17 March 2015) was a religious scholar of Sofia Noorbakhsia (sect of Islam). He translated several Islamic books to Urdu. Dawat-e-Sofia and Alfiqa-tul-Ahwat are two main Noorbakhshi Books. He was born in Barrah a village in Ghanche District Gilgit-Baltistan Pakistan. He did basic schooling from his own village.  Passed Matriculation from Khaplu Bala. He did his ARABI FAZIL from Wafaq ul Madaris Al-Arabia, Pakistan.

References 

20th-century Muslim scholars of Islam
1940 births
2015 deaths